Atal Setu Bridge is located at Rangpo, Pakyong district, Sikkim. It is the longest roadway bridge of Sikkim. It was inaugurated by Honourable President of India Smt. Droupadi Murmu on 4th November 2022. It is constructed by National Highways and Infrastructure Development Corporation Limited (NHIDCL). The bridge which lies on National Highway 10 is 1123 metres long and is over River Rangpo and connects Pakyong District of Sikkim with Kalimpong district of West Bengal. The construction was started on 20 Nov 2017 ,official completion slated on 20 Feb 2020 but due to certain circumstances and pandemic, construction work took a little more time.

This bridge is also known as Rangpo IBM bridge.

This bridge is constructed on Viaduct Engineering concept has 18 modules (slabs) glued to one another from either side making it tensile enough to face 8 to 9 Richter Scale Earthquake , since Sikkim lies in seismic zone 5. Bridge is double lane which has footpath facility on both sides. The cost of project as per report is Rs 56 Crore approximately.

References

Bridges completed in 2022
Pakyong district
Transport in Sikkim
Bridges in Sikkim
Road bridges in India